Cranborne Chase and West Wiltshire Downs is an Area of Outstanding Natural Beauty (AONB) covering  of Dorset, Hampshire, Somerset and Wiltshire. It is the sixth largest AONB in England. 

The area was designated as an AONB in 1981 and confirmed in October 1983. Since 2014, the AONB Partnership of local authorities has used the abbreviated name Cranborne Chase AONB in its promotion of the area.

The AONB includes several distinct landscape areas, among them:
 Cranborne Chase, an area of chalk downland in the south.
 West Wiltshire Downs, an area of chalk downland in the north.
 The Vale of Wardour, a wide clay valley between the two areas of downland.
 The area around Stourhead and Longleat on the Somerset-Wiltshire border, which has a distinctive characteristic of upper greensand hills.

Much of the landscape is farmed chalk downland. The people who populated the area thousands of years ago constructed Ackling Dyke and the Knowlton Circles. The area was later the scene of conflict in the Civil War, seeing the destruction of Old Wardour Castle. Other features include the Larmer Tree Gardens at Tollard Royal; and Fovant, where soldiers training during the First World War cut regimental badges into the chalk hillside.

The AONB includes two large blocks of woodland, Grovely Wood and Great Ridge Wood.

References

External links
 Cranborne Chase AONB Woodfair
 Historic landscape characterisation - explore the history and archaeology of the AONB

Areas of Outstanding Natural Beauty in England
Protected areas of Dorset
Protected areas of Hampshire
Protected areas of Somerset
Protected areas of Wiltshire